Dettelbach is a town in the district of Kitzingen in the Regierungsbezirk Unterfranken in Bavaria, Germany. It is situated on the right bank of the Main, 20 km east of Würzburg, and 8 km north of Kitzingen. It includes neighboring villages as administrative subdivisions, namely Bibergau, Brück, Dettelbach-Bahnhof, Effeldorf, Euerfeld, Mainsondheim, Neuses am Berg, Neusetz, Schernau und Schnepfenbach.

Dettelbach was first mentioned as a settlement in 741 AD. "Stadtrecht" town privileges were granted in 1484 AD.
Dettelbach has a nearly complete medieval city wall that includes towers and two remaining town gates. Dettelbach's most prominent architectural features are cobble-stoned streets with picturesque rows of half-timbered houses, and historic buildings dating as far back as the Renaissance, or even late-Gothic era.

Dettelbach is famous for its wine, available from a number of local wineries. One major tourist attraction is the annual wine fest in the heart of downtown. The festival takes place every year from the Catholic Feast of Corpus Christi to the Sunday following the holiday.
A local specialty are "Muskatzinen," flavorful pastries spiced with nutmeg, made after a secret recipe.

Mayor
Dettelbach's current mayor is Matthias Bielek (Freie Wähler). He received 56.6% of votes at the second round of the 2020 local elections.

Sons and daughters of the town

 Franz Christoph von Rothmund (1801-1891), German surgeon
 Ela Weber (born 1966), German-Italian announcer and presenter

References

External links

 Dettelbach website
 
 Neuses am Berg
 Euerfeld
 
 

Kitzingen (district)